Marupadiyum is a 1993 Indian Tamil-language drama film written, filmed and directed by Balu Mahendra. The film stars Revathi, Nizhalgal Ravi, Arvind and Rohini. A remake of the 1982 Hindi film Arth, it focuses on Thulasi, a wife caught up in marital discord, and her life henceforth.

Marupadiyum was released on 14 January 1993. Revathi won the Filmfare Award for Best Tamil Actress for her performance.

Plot 
Thulasi, who grew up as an orphan girl and always dreamt of owning a house, becomes insecure when she finds that she and her husband, Muralikrishna, have to leave the apartment they rent. The twist that occurred when Murali gives her the keys of a new house proves to be double-edged, when it is revealed that he is in love with another woman, Kavitha, with whom he earned the money (in the film industry) for the new apartment. While previously giving advice to her maid cheated by her husband, now Thulasi becomes herself involved in a similar situation.

When Murali deserts Thulasi for Kavitha, she chooses to leave the apartment for a women's hostel with only  that she had when she got married. She is helped by Gowrishankar, a singer, to surpass the difficulties of life as a single person, to find a job and to rely morally on herself. Gowrishankar and Thulasi become good friends. Gradually, Kavitha's mental instability deepens her fears of insecurity, even after Murali requests Thulasi to sign the divorce papers.

Gowrishankar falls in love with Thulasi and proposes to her. She refuses, saying she is empty and cannot give him anything. Gowrishankar tries to persuade her saying that she cannot spend the rest of her life feeling miserable about the past and that she should try to find a new life for herself. Thulasi promises to think about it.

Thulasi's maid, whose only aim in life is to secure a good education for her daughter, has saved  towards her admission fees. She finds out that her drunk husband has stolen the money. Enraged, she searches for him only to find him spending all the money. She murders him, goes to the police station and confesses her crime. Worried about her daughter, she calls Thulasi who promises to take care of the daughter.

After the insistence of Kavitha's mother and her personal doctor, Thulasi personally assures Kavitha that she is not interested in Murali anymore. However, Thulasi's attitude only convinces Kavitha that breaking Thulasi's marriage was a mistake. To escape from her feeling of guilt and insecurity, she breaks up with Murali. The latter tries to revive his relation with Thulasi, but is rejected.

Thulasi continues to live with her maid's daughter and refuses to marry Gowrishankar saying that she has found a new meaning to life in being independent and being a mother to the child and marrying Gowrishankar will only weaken her. Gowrishankar agrees, and wishes Thulasi well as she prepares to lead an independent life.

Cast 
 Revathi as Thulasi
 Nizhalgal Ravi as Muralikrishna
 Arvind as Gowrishankar
 Rohini as Kavitha
 Vinodhini as Thulasi's friend
 Suresh Chakravarthi as Suresh
 Sathya as the domestic help

Production 
Although Marupadiyum is a remake of the Hindi film Arth (1982), director and cinematographer Balu Mahendra described it as being "dangerously close to [his] own life." According to Rohini, he told her not to apply make-up to look fairer because of his preference for dark-skinned heroines who he considered were "more attractive and had different shades". Revathi initially wanted to play the role of the extramarital lover, but ultimately got the role of the wife.

Soundtrack 
The soundtrack was composed by Ilaiyaraaja. The song "Aasai Athigam" is set in the Carnatic raga known as Sindhu Bhairavi, "Ellorukum Nalla Kaalam" is set in Suddha Dhanyasi, and "Nalam Vazha" is set in Madhukauns. For the Telugu-dubbed version Director Gari Pellam, all songs were written by Rajasri.

Release and reception 
Marupadiyum was released on 14 January 1993. The Indian Express wrote that the film "looks more like a second-hand import of another man's experiences, told more beautifully no doubt, but not with equal finesse". K. Vijiyan of New Straits Times wrote that it is "a slow-moving movie, not to be attempted when you are tired or sleepy." Kalki critic applauded Mahendra's direction and Rohini's hysteria-based performance as new to Tamil cinema, but gave the film an overall mixed review. At the 41st Filmfare Awards South, Revathi won the Filmfare Award for Best Tamil Actress for her performance. No print of the film is known to survive, but it is still available on home video.

In popular culture 
The song "Aasai Adhigam" was featured in the 2019 film Kaithi where it became a trend in Tamil Nadu after its release.

References

Bibliography

External links 

1990s Tamil-language films
1993 drama films
1993 films
Films about adultery in India
Films directed by Balu Mahendra
Films scored by Ilaiyaraaja
Indian drama films
Tamil remakes of Hindi films